National Secondary Route 237, or just Route 237 (or ) is a National Road Route of Costa Rica, located in the Puntarenas province.

Description
In Puntarenas province the route covers Buenos Aires canton (Potrero Grande district), Coto Brus canton (San Vito, Aguabuena, Limoncito districts), Corredores canton (Corredor district).

History
This route was severely damaged in November 2020 due to the indirect effects of Hurricane Eta.

References

Highways in Costa Rica